Ewen MacAskill (born 1951) is a Scottish journalist. He worked for 22 years on The Guardian, ending his career in September 2018 as the newspaper's defence and intelligence correspondent. MacAskill was involved in preparing the publication disclosures from Edward Snowden of the activities of the American National Security Agency (NSA).

Career
MacAskill was a political editor for The Scotsman for six years (1990–96) before becoming chief political correspondent for The Guardian. In 2007, he was named Washington DC bureau chief.

While based in the United States, he was involved in preparing the Edward Snowden revelations concerning the NSA for publication liaising with Snowden and his contact, Glenn Greenwald, who had brought the story to the attention of then GuardianUS editor Janine Gibson. As a result of his reporting on Global surveillance disclosures, he was named co-recipient of the 2013 George Polk Award. The same reporting also contributed to the Pulitzer Prize for Public Service awarded jointly to The Guardian and The Washington Post in April 2014. MacAskill's retirement from The Guardian was announced on 22 September 2018.

MacAskill is portrayed by British actor Tom Wilkinson in the Edward Snowden biopic Snowden, directed by Oliver Stone and starring Joseph Gordon-Levitt as Snowden.

He wrote a reportage book with the journalist Luke Harding on the PRISM program, a secret NSA project of massive recording of the Google and Yahoo servers, combined with the main digital platforms.

References

1950s births
Living people
British male journalists
George Polk Award recipients
Place of birth missing (living people)
Scottish political journalists
Year of birth missing (living people)